Patrick Einsle (born 22 April 1987 in Füssen, Bavaria) is a former German professional snooker player.

Career

Early years
In 1998, at the age of 11, Einsle began to play snooker. He made his first century break at the age of 14.

He participated at the 2005 World Games in snooker, but failed in the first round 1–3 to the eventual gold medallist Gerard Greene.  At the 2006 Fürth German Open Einsle won against Fergal O'Brien and Stephen Lee and lost only 2–3 in the quarter-finals to the eventual finalist Barry Hawkins.

2006/2007 season
Einsle turned professional in 2006–07, after receiving a Main Tour wildcard from the WPBSA following the withdrawal of Paul Hunter. He dropped off the tour after the same season.

Einsle had his first qualification match on the Main Tour only three days after his appeal, he lost in the qualifying round of the Northern Ireland Trophy clearly with 0–5 against Lee Page. At the Grand Prix he survived the first two qualification rounds and was able to collect some points for the snooker world rankings. His third qualification match for the Malta, he lost with 4:5 against Mark Joyce.

In the qualifying for the Masters he lost in the first round 1–4 against Chris Norbury. He also lost in the first qualifying rounds of the UK Championship, the Welsh Open, the China Open and the World Championship, as he was defeated by 9–0 Judd Trump, 5–1 by Lee Spick, 2–5 by Andrew Higginson and 4–10 by Passakorn Suwannawat respectively. At the end he was ranked 94 of the snooker world ranking and thus lost his place on the Main Tour.

Amateur 2007–2010
On 1 November 2009 Einsle defeated Itaro Santos, his friend and training partner, 4–2 in the final of the German Championship, held in Bad Wildungen, to win the title for the first time. During the tournament he lost only two frames.

2010/2011 season
He was awarded another wildcard from the WPBSA for the 2010–11 Main Tour.

He achieved first success in the third event of the Players Tour Championship, when he defeated Jimmy Robertson and former world champion Peter Ebdon, before losing in round 3. In the qualifying for the Shanghai Masters he won his first qualifying match, but he lost in the second round to Irishman Joe Delaney. After the first cut-off point of the world rankings (after EPTC event 2) he was ranked 87 in the world. In the sixth event of the tour he beat Nigel Bond in the first round and was defeated by Ali Carter, at this time No. 2 in the world ranking, with just 3–4.

In December, he withdrew from the Tour for the remainder of the season.

2013/2014 season
In April 2013 Einsle won one of the three final matches of the EBSA Qualifying Tour and thus received a two-year tour ticket for the 2013–14 and 2014–15 seasons. However, he only won two matches of his fourteen in the season at the last 128 stage of PTC events, which left him ranked 118th at the end of the season. Einsle didn't enter a single event after the Gdynia Open in February 2014 and eventually resigned from the main tour once again.

Return to amateur status

Since dropping off the tour Einsle plays in the Paul Hunter Classic which is held in Fürth every year. In 2014 he lost 4–3 to Marc Davis in the second qualifying round.
In 2015 he won three matches to reach the main draw, but lost 4–1 to Matthew Stevens in the first round and he was knocked out by the same opponent 4–2 in the opening round a year later.

Century breaks 
His highest break of 146 points he scored in an U21-tournament. His highest professional break is 112.

Performance and rankings timeline

Career finals

Pro-am finals: 1

Amateur finals: 4 (3 titles)

References

External links

 
 Global Snooker Profile
 Pro Snooker Blog Profile
 Results & Statistics on CueTracker

1987 births
Living people
German snooker players
Sportspeople from Füssen
Competitors at the 2005 World Games